Liam Walker (born 13 April 1988) is a Gibraltarian footballer who plays as a midfielder for Lincoln Red Imps and the Gibraltar national team. 

He spent most of his career with lower-league Spanish clubs and in the Gibraltar Premier Division. He also had brief spells with England's Portsmouth (League One) and Notts County (League Two), and Bnei Yehuda Tel Aviv in the Israeli Premier League. He made his international debut for Gibraltar in their first official game in 2013, and as of 2022, he is the current record caps holder and goalscorer for Gibraltar.

Club career

Spanish lower levels
Walker began his career in Algeciras CF, making his debut on 22 October 2006, against Ayamonte. He received his first start on 22 May 2007, against CD Mairena. He already had trials with Manchester United, Everton and Aston Villa as a teenager.

In 2008 summer, Walker joined Atlético Zabal (Real Balompédica Linense's farm team), but only appeared in eight matches (575 minutes overall), scoring six times. During the 2009–10 season, he was promoted to Linense's first team, but only made four appearances, all from the bench, 89 minutes overall.

In January 2010, he signed with UD Los Barrios, and made his debut on the 31st, against Puerto Real CF. He scored his first goal on 27 April, against Sevilla FC C. In May 2010, Walker returned to Linense, getting more playing time than his last spell, appearing in 13 matches (849 minutes overall) and scoring once (against UD Los Palacios on 26 September).

In January of the following year, he signed a contract with CD San Roque, in Spanish fifth division. In his first season, he only appeared six times and scored once, with his team being promoted to fourth division. In his second season, he was the club's topscorer and best player of the season, scoring ten goals in 30 games (all starts).

Portsmouth

In July 2012, Walker was called by Portsmouth manager Michael Appleton to train with the club, after an impressive performance for Gibraltar. He was a part of the squad in the club pre-season matches, against Bolton Wanderers, on 4 August. In his next game, on 8 August, he scored the final goal, against AFC Wimbledon.

On 16 August, Walker signed a one-month contract with Pompey. However, due to his international clearance not being made by RFEF in time, he was unable to play on the opening day of the League One season against Bournemouth. He only made his debut on 21 August 2012, in an away match against Colchester United, coming in for Kieran Djilali who started on the bench. Walker played on the wing on his debut whilst Portsmouth captain Brian Howard and Lee Williamson played in the centre. Portsmouth drew with Colchester 2–2, with goals for Pompey through Luke Rodgers and Jordan Obita. Walker hit the post early in the second half and also assisted Rodgers in the first goal of the match. He then started in the following two games (against Carlisle United and Oldham Athletic), before being dropped to the bench. Walker only received a start three months later, against Yeovil Town, on 29 December.

Walker scored his first league goal for Portsmouth against Scunthorpe United on 2 February 2013. He scored his second on the 16th, against Carlisle United, from the penalty spot. Walker finished the season with three assists, only behind Jed Wallace (5) and Howard (6).

At the end of the season, Walker was challenged to earn a new deal by manager Guy Whittingham. However, on 9 July, Walker announced that he would join a Greek club.

Trials and back to San Roque
It was reported that Walker turned up at a training base of Dundee United in Spain without notice and requested a possible trial. This was however refused by Dundee United's management. He was also linked to a move for Aris Thessaloniki, but the deal fell through.

In late July, Walker returned to San Roque, only training with the club while waiting for a "convincing offer" from any club. On 2 August, he signed with San Roque.

Walker scored in his San Roque re-debut on 5 October, but in a 1–2 home loss against Recreativo B. He finished his second spell with the club with nine appearances, scoring two goals.

Bnei Yehuda
On 9 January 2014, it was announced that Walker had been released from his contract with CD San Roque after his buyout clause had been met. On 21 January 2013 he joined Israeli Premier League side Bnei Yehuda Tel Aviv F.C. on a -year contract, after being recommended by Yossi Benayoun and reuniting with former teammate James Keene.

He played 14 total games during his time in the Middle East, scoring a long-range free kick in a 2–0 win at Hapoel Ra'anana on 1 February.

Lincoln Red Imps
On 16 September 2014, Lincoln Red Imps announced that Walker had returned to Gibraltar to play for them. In his first season, Walker scored 13 goals in 10 league matches, placing him third in the league in scoring. In August 2016, it was Lincoln Red Imps announced that Walkers recently expired contract would not be extended. In total Walker appeared in 43 league matches for the club, scoring 24 goals.

Europa FC
On 18 August 2016 it was announced that Walker had signed for Europa FC, a regular Europa League participant and fellow Gibraltar Premier Division club. Walker debuted for Europa on 18 September 2016 in the 2016 Pepe Reyes Cup against his former club Lincoln. Europa won the match 2–0 with Enrique "Kike" Gomez scoring a brace. Walker tallied an assists and played all 90 minutes of the match. During Europa's first match of the 2016–17 season, Walker scored his first goal for his new club on his league debut, the only goal in 1–0 victory over Lions Gibraltar.

Notts County
After scoring in the Greens' Champions League exit to The New Saints, Walker went on trial with EFL League One club Southend United, appearing in the second half of their friendly with Braintree Town. He then went on trial with Notts County of EFL League Two and appeared in a pre-season friendly against Nottingham Forest. 

On 25 July 2017, it was confirmed that he had impressed manager Kevin Nolan enough to earn a permanent deal with the Magpies. He made his debut on 5 August, starting in a 3–0 loss at Coventry City in the season opener. On 30 April 2018, Walker left the Meadow Lane club after 19 official games "to pursue opportunities elsewhere". He signed a three-year contract back at Europa in June.

International career

Walker played in 2011 Island Games, starting in all Gibraltar's matches, and scoring a hat-trick against Ynys Môn on 27 June. Walker stood as the only professional player in the national team.

After Gibraltar was accepted as a member of UEFA, Walker was selected as part of the 23-man squad for Gibraltar's official debut against Slovakia on 19 November 2013. He earned a starting spot in a 0–0 draw, played in Faro, Portugal. 

Walker scored his first international goal, and Gibraltar's first goal in a competitive FIFA fixture, with a left-footed blast to tie against Greece in Gibraltar's World Cup qualifying debut on 6 September 2016, tying the match 1–1 before eventually falling 1–4. Walker was named the FIFA Player of the Day following the match. He scored his second international goal, levelling the record set by Jake Gosling and Lee Casciaro, on 25 March 2018. A deflected free-kick saw Gibraltar beat Latvia 1–0 at the Victoria Stadium.

In November 2020, Walker became the first player to reach 50 caps for Gibraltar since the national team joined UEFA.

In 2021, scored his third goal in the defeat against Latvia.

In 2022, scored his fourth goal in the draw against Bulgaria and become the top scorer of the national team.

Career statistics

Club

International

Scores and results list Gibraltar's goal tally first, score column indicates score after each Walker goal.

Honours 
Lincoln Red Imps

 Gibraltar Premier Division: 2014–15, 2015–16
 Rock Cup: 2014–15, 2015–16
 Pepe Reyes Cup: 2015

Europa

 Gibraltar Premier Division: 2016–17
 Rock Cup: 2016–17, 2019
 Pepe Reyes Cup: 2019

Individual

 Gibraltar Premier Division Player of the Month: November 2019

 Gibraltar Premier Division Midfielder of the Season: 2019–20
 Gibraltar Premier Division Player of the Season: 2019–20
 Gibraltar Premier Division Fans' Player of the Season: 2019–20
 Gibraltar Premier Division Fans' Team of the Season: 2019–20

References

External links

Bnei Yehuda Museum

1988 births
Living people
Gibraltarian footballers
Gibraltar international footballers
Gibraltarian expatriate footballers
Association football midfielders
Algeciras CF footballers
UD Los Barrios footballers
CD San Roque footballers
Portsmouth F.C. players
Bnei Yehuda Tel Aviv F.C. players
Lincoln Red Imps F.C. players
Europa F.C. players
Notts County F.C. players
Segunda División B players
Tercera División players
Primera Andaluza players
Divisiones Regionales de Fútbol players
English Football League players
Israeli Premier League players
Gibraltar Premier Division players
Gibraltar pre-UEFA international footballers
Gibraltar National League players
Expatriate footballers in Israel
Expatriate footballers in England
Expatriate footballers in Spain
Gibraltarian expatriate sportspeople in England
Gibraltarian expatriate sportspeople in Spain
Gibraltarian expatriate sportspeople in Israel